Albert George Leake (17 April 1930 – 24 July 1999) was an English footballer who played as a half-back.

He spent the entire 1950s with Port Vale, as the club enjoyed an exciting period of their history. He helped the "Valiants" to the Third Division North title in 1953–54, and Fourth Division title in 1958–59. After a total of 43 goals in 293 league and cup games, he left the club in 1961 for non-league Macclesfield Town, a club he served as manager from 1963 to 1967. He guided the club to a Cheshire County League and Cheshire Senior Cup double in 1963–64.

He also played cricket for Staffordshire in the Minor Counties Cricket Championship between 1955 and 1960. He was a right-handed batsman who fielded as a wicket-keeper.

Career
Leake played for Stoke City and the RAF before joining Port Vale from Stoke in February 1950. He made his debut on 24 March 1951, in a 3–1 win over Bristol City at Ashton Gate. Signed and given his debut by Gordon Hodgson, the manager's early death meant that Leake had to win a regular first team place under new boss Freddie Steele. He played eight Third Division South games in 1951–52, scoring his first senior goal on 1 September, in a 1–1 draw with Watford at Vale Park.

He became a first team regular from December 1952, and scored four goals in 26 games in 1952–53, as the "Valiants" finished as runners-up of the Third Division North. He hit 20 goals in 48 appearances in 1953–54, as Vale won the Third Division North title and reached the semi-finals of the FA Cup. He was the scorer of the FA Cup semi-final goal against West Bromwich Albion in Vale's 2–1 defeat and also had an equaliser disallowed for offside. He had previously scored five of Vale's six goals from the Third Round onwards that were enough to defeat Queens Park Rangers, Cardiff City, Blackpool, and Leyton Orient.

Leake scored six goals in 30 games in 1954–55, as Vale retained their Second Division status. He hit four goals in 38 games in 1955–56, before losing his first team place to Harry Poole. He hit four goals in 22 appearances in 1956–57, as Vale suffered relegation despite the best efforts of new boss Norman Low. He featured 34 times in 1957–58, and was an ever-present in the 1958–59 season as the club won the Fourth Division title. He scored three goals in 39 games in 1959–60, however he lost his first team place in April 1960. He did not play a Third Division game in 1960–61, and was instead transferred to Macclesfield Town in January 1961. Two years later he was appointed as Macclesfield's new manager, and using firm discipline he led the club to the Cheshire County League and Cheshire Senior Cup double in 1963–64. They went on to finish second in 1964–65, third in 1965–66, and fifth in 1966–67. Upon losing his position he joined Goldenhill Y. & A. as a player. He worked as a school attendance officer between 1966 and 1995. He died at Norton le Moors in Staffordshire on 24 July 1999.

Career statistics
Source:

Honours
Port Vale
Football League Third Division North: 1953–54
Football League Fourth Division: 1958–59

Macclesfield Town
Cheshire County League: 1963–64
Cheshire Senior Cup: 1964
Cheshire County League runner-up: 1964–65
Cheshire County Challenge Cup: 1967

References

1930 births
1999 deaths
Footballers from Stoke-on-Trent
English footballers
Association football wing halves
Stoke City F.C. players
Port Vale F.C. players
Macclesfield Town F.C. players
English Football League players
English football managers
Macclesfield Town F.C. managers
English cricketers
Staffordshire cricketers
Wicket-keepers